Sainte-Cécile-de-Milton is a municipality in the Canadian province of Quebec, located within La Haute-Yamaska Regional County Municipality. The population as of the Canada 2011 Census was 2,128.

Demographics

Population
Population trend:

Language
Mother tongue language (2006)

See also
List of municipalities in Quebec

References

External links

Municipalities in Quebec
Incorporated places in La Haute-Yamaska Regional County Municipality